The CONIFA Africa Football Cup is an international football tournament organized by CONIFA, an umbrella association for states, minorities, stateless peoples and regions unaffiliated with FIFA.

History

Zanzibar 2021
In February 2021, ConIFA announced that the 2021 edition of the CONIFA Africa Football Cup would take place in Zanzibar City, Zanzibar and feature 10 teams. The tournament was cancelled.

South Africa 2022
Biafra, Matabeleland, and Yoruba Nation participated. The Matches were Yoruba Nation 1–1 Matabeleland, Matabeleland 1–0 Biafra FF, Biafra FF 1–0 Yoruba Nation, and Matabeleland 0–1 Biafra FF (Final).

Results

Appearances
 Legend
  — Champions
  — Runners-up
  — Third place
  — Fourth place
 GS — Group Stage
 q — Qualified for upcoming tournament
  — Qualified but withdrew
  — Did not qualify
  — Did not enter / Withdrew / Banned / Entry not accepted by CONIFA
  — Hosts

For each tournament, the number of teams in each finals tournament (in brackets) are shown.

Members of CONIFA Africa

References

Confederation of Independent Football Associations
Non-FIFA football competitions